Bo Bo Gyi traditionally refers to the name of a guardian deity (called nat) unique to each Burmese Buddhist temple or pagoda. Bo Bo Gyi is typically depicted as a nearly life-sized elderly man, dressed in a curved cap and sometimes carrying a cane, to signify old age. Offerings of scarves and paso are common by worshipers. There are many Bo Bo Gyi shrines throughout the country, and some are more widely respected than others. The Shwenyaungbin (Golden Banyan Tree) Bo Bo Gyi shrine between Yangon and Bago is often visited by new car owners hoping have their cars blessed by the Bo Bo Gyi spirit at that site. 

According to a legend of Shwedagon Pagoda, the Gautama Buddha's hair relics were given to two Mon merchants who later gave them to the King of Yangon, wanting the relics to be properly enshrined in a pagoda. Bo Bo Gyi, as an avatar of Indra, came down to earth and pointed his finger to the proper location where that pagoda should be built, which is where the Shwedagon Pagoda is. Hence, he is popularly depicted as a figure pointing his finger as a reference to this legend.

Bo Bo Gyi is highly respected amongst Thai people as thep than chai (the deity [who may grant your wish] immediately). Many believe that praying to, wishing to, and having their forehead touched by the deity's pointing finger of the thep than chai, especially at Botataung Pagoda in Yangon, will bring them luck.

Images

References

Burmese nats
Burmese culture